The Tournament of the Gardens Open was a golf tournament on the PGA Tour from 1933 to 1937. It was held at the Country Club of Charleston in Charleston, South Carolina, which in 2019 hosted the U.S. Women's Open.

Winners
1937 Henry Picard
1936 Henry Picard
1935 Henry Picard
1934 Paul Runyan
1933 Walter Hagen

Former PGA Tour events
Golf in South Carolina
Recurring sporting events established in 1933
Recurring sporting events disestablished in 1937
1933 establishments in South Carolina
1937 disestablishments in South Carolina